Professor Paul Otto Alfred Kluke (31 July 1908, in Dabendorf near Zossen – 18 April 1990, in Wiesbaden) was director of the German Historical Institute London from August 1975 to July 1977.

References 

1908 births
1990 deaths
20th-century German historians
Academics of the German Historical Institute London
Writers from Brandenburg